Horrocks also known as Horrocks Beach is a coastal town in the Mid West region of Western Australia.

In the  Horrocks had a population of 138 people in 184 dwellings (63 occupied). Most of the dwellings are holiday houses. The population of Horrocks fluctuates depending on tourism, with the town at full capacity during school holidays and throughout the summer. During the census (Tuesday 9 August) 62% of dwellings were unoccupied (national average 11%).

The town was named after Joseph Lucas Horrocks, a convict who was transported to Western Australia in 1851 for forging and uttering. Horrocks received a conditional pardoned in 1856. He built a non-denominational and first church in Northampton.

References 

Shire of Northampton
Coastal towns in Western Australia